Dzietrzkowice  is a village in the administrative district of Gmina Łubnice, within Wieruszów County, Łódź Voivodeship, in central Poland.

The village has an approximate population of 1,000.

References

Dzietrzkowice
Kalisz Governorate